Maurice George Costello (February 22, 1877 – October 29, 1950) was a prominent American vaudeville actor of the late 1890s and early 1900s who later played a principal role in early American films as leading man, supporting player, and director.

Early life
Costello was born in Pittsburgh, Pennsylvania to Irish immigrants Ellen (née Fitzgerald; born 1853) and Thomas Costello (born 1852). His father Thomas died while repairing a blast furnace at Andrew Carnegie's Union Iron Mill when Maurice was just five months old. He had a strongly Irish upbringing, living with his mother, her Irish brother, and many Irish immigrant boarders.

Career
Costello made his film debut in 1908, but was long believed to have debuted in Adventures of Sherlock Holmes; or, Held for Ransom (1905), supposedly playing the lead in what is regarded as the first serious film to feature the character of Sherlock Holmes, since it was preceded only by the 30-second comedy film Sherlock Holmes Baffled (1900). However, Holmesian scholar Leslie S. Klinger has written that the identification of Costello in the role is flawed. Klinger states that the first identification of Costello with the role was in Michael Pointer's Public Life of Sherlock Holmes published in 1975 but Pointer later realized his error and wrote to Klinger stating

Costello joined Vitagraph, being a member of the first motion picture stock company ever formed, playing opposite Florence Turner. Among some of his best known pictures are A Tale of Two Cities, The Man Who Couldn't Beat God and For the Honor of the Family. Costello was notorious for his refusal to help build sets, insisting that he was "hired as an actor and nothing else", despite the common practice of the time. From this and his role as the creator of the first known school of screen acting, Costello is sometimes credited as "the father of screen acting".

Costello was one of the world's first leading men in early American cinema, but like a lot of other silent screen stars, he found the transition to "talkies" extremely difficult. While his leading man status was largely lost, Costello continued to appear in movies, often in small roles and bit parts, right up until his death in 1950.

Maurice Costello also discovered Moe Howard of the Three Stooges, who, as a teenager, ran errands and got lunches for the actors at the Vitagraph Studios at no charge. This impressed Costello who brought him in and introduced him to other leading actors of the day. Moe then gained small parts in many of the Vitagraph movies but most of these were destroyed by fire that swept the studios in 1910.

Personal life

Costello was married to actress Mae Costello (née Altschuk). On November 23, 1913, Costello was arrested for beating his wife Mae. On November 25, 1913, Costello admitted that he had beaten his wife while intoxicated. Mae Costello requested that the charges be dropped to disorderly conduct, and Costello was given six months probation by Magistrate Geisner of the Coney Island Police Court.

Costello died at the age of 73 in 1950 in Los Angeles, California of a heart problem and was interred at Calvary Cemetery, East Los Angeles, a Catholic cemetery.

His descendants include two daughters, actresses Dolores Costello and Helene Costello, a grandson John Drew Barrymore, and a great granddaughter Drew Barrymore.

Filmography

References

External links

 
 Biography at Hollywood Heritage
 

1877 births
1950 deaths
Male actors from Pittsburgh
American male film actors
American people of Irish descent
American male silent film actors
American male stage actors
Vaudeville performers
20th-century American male actors
Burials at Calvary Cemetery (Los Angeles)